Ryun Thomas Williams (born March 26, 1969) is an American college basketball coach who is the current head women's basketball coach at Colorado State.

Early life and college playing career
Born in Gillette, Wyoming, Williams graduated from Campbell County High School and was awarded the Wyoming Mr. Basketball award in 1988.

Williams played junior college basketball at Sheridan College before transferring to the University of South Dakota, where he played two seasons at guard for the South Dakota Coyotes. Williams averaged 17.3 points and 2.3 rebound s in his junior season of 1990–91. As a senior in 1991–92, Williams averaged 9.4 points and 2.4 rebounds.

Coaching career
From 1993 to 1995, Williams was men's basketball assistant coach and women's volleyball head coach at Sheridan. Williams was women's basketball head coach at Sheridan from 1995 to 1998, during which he earned two Wyoming Conference Coach of the Year awards.

Williams moved up to the NCAA Division II ranks as head coach at Wayne State College in Nebraska in 1998. In ten seasons with Wayne State, Williams led the team to two NCAA Tournaments (2006 and 2008) and earned Northern Sun Intercollegiate Conference Coach of the Year honors in 2006 for Wayne State's first NCAA Tournament appearance in history.

In 2008, Williams returned to South Dakota to become women's basketball head coach, for his first Division I coaching position.  At the time, South Dakota was moving up from Division II. In Williams's last season as head coach in 2011–12, South Dakota reached a 23–8 record and WNIT appearance, the most success for the program in its Division I era.

Williams became head coach at Colorado State in 2012. Colorado State went 11–19 in his first season and improved to 25–8 in 2013–14, along with a Mountain West Conference regular season title and WNIT appearance. Colorado State won the MW regular season and made the WNIT again in 2014–15. In 2015–16, Colorado State finished first in the MW for the third straight season, this time with an 18–0 conference record. For the first time since the 2001–02 season, Colorado State was ranked in the AP Poll. During his time at CSU, Williams has quickly surged to the winningest women's basketball coach in CSU history, and has registered 20 win seasons in 6 of his seasons at the helm, and a winning record in 7 out of 10 seasons. This includes 5 consecutive 20+ win seasons, 4 of which included regular season conference championships.

Head coaching record

Junior college

College

References

1969 births
Living people
American women's basketball coaches
Basketball coaches from Wyoming
Basketball players from Wyoming
Colorado State Rams women's basketball coaches
Junior college women's basketball coaches in the United States
People from Gillette, Wyoming
Sheridan Generals men's basketball coaches
Sheridan Generals men's basketball players
South Dakota Coyotes men's basketball players
South Dakota Coyotes women's basketball coaches
Wayne State Wildcats
American men's basketball players
Guards (basketball)